Peter Himmelman (born November 23, 1959, in St. Louis Park, Minnesota) is an American singer-songwriter and film and television composer from Minnesota, who formerly played in the Minneapolis indie rock band Sussman Lawrence before pursuing an extensive solo career. Himmelman is also the founder of Big Muse, a company which helps individuals and organizations unlock their creative potential. He is married to Maria Dylan, a lawyer and adopted daughter of Bob Dylan. They have four children.

Career

Himmelman garnered his first solo deal on Island Records in 1985 after a video for the song "Eleventh Confession" made its way onto regular rotation on MTV. His first release entitled This Father's Day was composed for Himmelman's father David. In the early '90s, he achieved significant alternative radio play with songs including "The Woman With The Strength of 10000 Men", from his From Strength To Strength release. He was nominated for an Emmy Award in 2002 for his song "Best Kind Of Answer" which appeared in the CBS series Judging Amy, for which Himmelman also composed the score. He was the composer for the FOX television show Bones through the fourth season. He was nominated for a Grammy Award for his children's album, My Green Kite. USA Today has called Himmelman "one of rock's most wildly imaginative performers" for his often highly improvisational stage shows.

Big Muse 
In 2011 Himmelman began working with organizations and brands such as McDonald's, Gap Inc., and Banana Republic to help them achieve better communication, innovation and leadership with a company he started called Big Muse. The methodology Himmelman created is designed to help organizations increase innovative thinking, team building and leadership ability. Its main metaphor for teaching these skills is songwriting.

Discography

Solo studio albums 
1986: This Father's Day (reissued 1995)
1987: Gematria
1989: Synesthesia
1991: From Strength to Strength
1992: Flown This Acid World
1994: Skin
1999: Love Thinketh No Evil
2004: Unstoppable Forces (bonus disc: Himmelvaults, vol. 3)
2005: Imperfect World2007: Pigeons Couldn't Sleep (bonus DVD: Rock God – originally titled: Mittin Derinin)
2010: The Mystery and the Hum2014: The Boat That Carries Us2017: There Is No Calamity2020: Press On Band albums 
1978: Shangoya – "Get a Grip" – 7" single
1979: Sussman Lawrence – Hail to the Modern Hero (reissued 1980)
1984: Sussman Lawrence – Pop City2004: The Complete Sussman Lawrence (1979–1985) (double CD reissue with bonus tracks) (CD, Deep Shag Records)
2013: Minnesota – Are You There? (2013)

 Solo children's albums 
1997: My Best Friend Is a Salamander2000: My Fabulous Plum (re-issued 2004)
2004: My Lemonade Stand2007: My Green Kite2009: My Trampoline Live albums 
1996: Stage Diving – Live from The Bottom Line – NY, NY
2008: Pen and Ink Greatest hits compilations 
2004: The Complete Sussman Lawrence (1979–1985) (double CD reissue with bonus tracks) (CD, Deep Shag Records)
2005: Mission of My Soul, The Best of Peter Himmelman2007: Songs of Folly and Transcendence (1998–2007)2011: Best of Kids Collection: Songs to Make Boring Days Fun Rarities releases 
1998: Himmelvaults, Vol. 11999: Himmelman Music for Film2002: Himmelvaults, Vol. 22004: Himmelvaults, Vol. 3 – bundled with Unstoppable Forces
2005: Himmelvaults, Vol. 4 Pristine2005: Himmelvaults, Vol. 5 When Grace Collides with Sin2006: Himmelvaults, Vol. 62007: Himmelvaults, Vol. 72008: Himmelvaults, Vol. 82009: Blackout in the Book of Light2011: Flimsy2014: Himmelvaults, Vol. 9Spinoza Bear Project
-In the early 1980s Peter Himmelman wrote and produced songs for Spinoza Bear, a therapeutic stuffed animal that was used to eliminate the stress of children in hospitals, rape victims, autism sufferers and others. He was also the voice of the bear.

1984: I'm Your Friend and My Name Is Spinoza – Bonding, Opens Communication1985: You Are All You Need To Be – Encouragement, Self Esteem1985: Everybody Needs A Little Tenderness – Ease Anxiety1985: Dream on the Water – Encourage Sleep1986: Do You Wonder – Curiosity, Learning 
1986: Good Friends – Feelings, Relationships1991: New Beginnings – Relaxation, Healthy Choices1991: Breathing Healthy, Breathing Free – Positive Attitude, Deep Breathing1991: Hold On to Me – Grief and LossFilmography
Furious World

He was also the creative force behind Furious World his live Internet show,(2008–2010) which broadcast every Tuesday evening at 7 pm (PT) from his home studio. The highly innovative show featured original live music with his band, video segments that ranged from philosophical to comedic, and special guests from the world of technology, music and the arts.

Rock G-d Film 

Rock G-d is a documentary about Peter Himmelman directed by Keith Wolf. It is described as "a road epic about the pursuit of an adolescent dream into adult reality that powerfully touches on issues of faith, fame and failure".

Film and TV composition credits
TV scoring credits
 Bones (FOX)
 Judging Amy (CBS) – Emmy nominated song "Best Kind of Answer"
 Men in Trees (ABC)
 Ex List (CBS)
 Heartland (TNT)
 Freshmen Diaries (Showtime)
 The American Embassy (FOX)
 Going to California (Showtime)
 Making the Band 4 (MTV)
 Bug Juice (Disney)
 ER – Season 9 – "A Thousand Cranes" (NBC): "Always in Disguise" from the album Flown This Acid World
 Miami Vice – Season 3 "Lend Me an Ear" (NBC)
 How To Rock (Nickelodeon)

Film music/scoring credits
 Ash Tuesday – Janeane Garofalo
 Four Feet
 The Souler Opposite – Chris Meloni, Tim Busfield
 Bill's Gun Shop
 A Slipping-Down Life – Guy Pearce, Lili Taylor
 Dinner & Driving – Joey Slotnick, Paula DeVico, Sam Robards, Brigitte Bako
 Liar's Poker – Flea
 Crossing The Bridge – Jason Gedrick, Stephen Baldwin, David Schwimmer
 Pyrates – Kevin Bacon, Kyra Sedgwick
 Queen Sized – Nikki Blonsky
 Porn 'n Chicken
 Snow in August
 A Face to Kill For – Doug Savant, Crystal Bernard
 Long Gone – Dermot Mulroney
 Heart of Dixie – Ally Sheedy, Phoebe Cates, Treat Williams

Awards
 ASCAP – Top TV Series: Judging Amy (2000)
 ASCAP – Top TV Series: Judging Amy (2003)
 ASCAP – Top TV Series: Judging Amy (2004)
 ASCAP – Top TV Series: Judging Amy (2005)
 Family Channel Seal of Quality – My Best Friend is a Salamander (1997)
 Family Channel Seal of Quality -My Fabulous Plum (2003)
 Parents Choice – My Best Friend is a Salamander (1997)
 Parents Choice – My Fabulous Plum (2003)
 Parents Choice – My Green Kite (2007)
 Parents Choice – My Trampoline (2009)
 National Parenting Publications Awards (NAPPA) Gold Award – My Green Kite (2007)
 National Parenting Publications Awards (NAPPA) Gold Award – My Trampoline (2009)
 Minnesota Music Award – Best Male Songwriter (1993)

Award nominations
 Emmy 2002 Music and Lyrics – Judging Amy, song: "The Best Kind Of Answer"
 Grammy 2008 Best Musical Album for Children – My Green KiteVisual art
Himmelman is also a visual artist and painter whose work appeared on the cover of his 1987 Island release Synesthesia''. A collection of his recent art can be found online.

References

American film score composers
American rock guitarists
American male guitarists
People from St. Louis Park, Minnesota
Living people
1959 births
American rock singers
Baalei teshuva
American male singer-songwriters
Jewish American musicians
Jewish rock musicians
Singer-songwriters from Minnesota
Guitarists from Minnesota
20th-century American guitarists
American male film score composers
20th-century American male musicians
21st-century American Jews